Marotolana is a municipality in Madagascar. It belongs to the district of Ambanja, which is a part of Diana Region. According to 2001 census the population of Marotolana was 10,538.

Only primary schooling is available in town. The majority 99% of the population are farmers.  The most important crops are rice and coffee, while other important agricultural products are cocoa and pepper.  Services provide employment for 1% of the population.

References and notes 

Populated places in Diana Region